El Camino High School is an alternative education high school located in Rohnert Park, California in the United States.

Campus
El Camino High School along with two other schools share a campus designed for what used to be Richard Crane Elementary School.

See also
Cotati-Rohnert Park Unified School District

External links
 

High schools in Sonoma County, California
Public high schools in California
Rohnert Park, California